Ronald Harbertson (born 23 December 1929) is an English former professional footballer who played as an inside forward.

Career
Born in Redcar, Harbertson played for Astley, East Chevington, North Shields, Newcastle United, Bradford City, Brighton & Hove Albion, Grimsby Town, Ashington, Darlington, Lincoln City, Wrexham and Grantham.

References

1929 births
Living people
English footballers
North Shields F.C. players
Newcastle United F.C. players
Bradford City A.F.C. players
Brighton & Hove Albion F.C. players
Ashington A.F.C. players
Darlington F.C. players
Lincoln City F.C. players
Wrexham A.F.C. players
Grantham Town F.C. players
English Football League players
Grimsby Town F.C. players
Association football inside forwards